Now is an album by saxophonist Eric Kloss recorded in 1978 and released on the Muse label.

Reception

The AllMusic review gy Scott Yanow stated: "The music is generally lyrical and the leader plays well, even if the rhythm section is fairly anonymous, but little all that memorable occurs".

Track listing 
All compositions by Eric Kloss.
 "We Are Together" - 7:32
 "Now" - 6:39
 "Morning Song" - 6:35
 "Hey, Hey, Whatta You Say?" - 5:21
 "Autumn Blue" - 6:22
 "Booga Wooga Woman" - 7:04

Personnel 
Eric Kloss - alto saxophone, tenor saxophone
Mike Nock - keyboards
Mike Richmond - bass
Jimmy Madison - drums
 Efrain Toro - cowbell

References 

1978 albums
Eric Kloss albums
Muse Records albums
Albums recorded at Van Gelder Studio